Admiral Purvis may refer to:

John Purvis (Royal Navy officer) (1787–1857), British Royal Navy vice admiral
John Child Purvis (died 1825), British Royal Navy admiral
Neville Purvis (born 1936), British Royal Navy vice admiral